Circus Days is a 1923 American silent comedy film starring child actor Jackie Coogan, directed by Eddie Cline, produced by Sol Lesser and Jackie Coogan's own production company, and distributed through Associated First National Pictures.

Preservation status
Circus Days had been considered a lost film, but a print survived in Russia. It was digitally presented to the Library of Congress from Russian archive Godmosfilm in 2010 along with several other lost silent films.

Cast
Jackie Coogan as Toby Tyler
Barbara Tennant as Ann Tyler
Russell Simpson as Eben Holt
Claire McDowell as Martha
Cesare Gravina as Luigi, the Clown
Peaches Jackson as Jeannette
Sam De Grasse as Lord the Concessionaire
DeWitt Jennings as Daly
Nellie Lane as Fat Woman
William Barlow as Human Skeleton, 'World's Skinniest Man'

References

External links

1923 comedy films
American black-and-white films
Silent American comedy films
American silent feature films
Circus films
Films directed by Edward F. Cline
Films produced by Sol Lesser
First National Pictures films
1920s rediscovered films
Rediscovered American films
1920s American films